The Best So Far may refer to:

The Best So Far (D'Angelo album)
The Best So Far (Cindy Morgan album)
The Best So Far (Robbie Williams album)
The Best So Far, by Anne Murray
The Best So Far... 2018 Tour Edition, by Celine Dion